Choqa Kabud (also Romanized as Choqā Kabūd and Chaqā Kabūd) is a village in Chaqa Narges Rural District, Mahidasht District, Kermanshah County, Kermanshah Province, Iran. During the 2006 census, its population was 222, in 45 families.

References 

Populated places in Kermanshah County